Nathan Abrams (December 25, 1897 – April 30, 1941) was an American football end in the National Football League who played for the Green Bay Packers. He was Jewish.  Abrams came out of Green Bay East High School and played one professional game in 1921.

See also
 List of Jews in sports

References

1897 births
1941 deaths
American football wide receivers
American people of Lithuanian-Jewish descent
Green Bay Packers players
Jewish American sportspeople
Sportspeople from Green Bay, Wisconsin
Green Bay East High School alumni
20th-century American Jews